Replay is the second studio album by Swedish girl group Play, released on 10 June 2003. It contains covers from British artists such as Billie Piper, Liberty X and Atomic Kitten. The first single off the album was "I Must Not Chase the Boys". The album peaked at number 67 on the Billboard 200 chart. Billboard named "I Must Not Chase the Boys" #76 on their list of 100 Greatest Girl Group Songs of All Time.

Track listing

Personnel
Faye Hamlin – lead vocals
Anaïs Lameche – lead vocals
Rosie Munter – backing vocals
Anna Sundstrand – backing vocals

Album trivia
Several songs on Replay are covers of the original versions by their respective artists:
"Honey to the Bee" was originally sung and released as a single by British popstar Billie Piper.
"Just A Little" was recorded with slightly more suggestive lyrics by British group Liberty X in 2001.
Both Play and American-British girl group No Secrets recorded "Whole Again" in late 2002 - but it was originally a hit for British girl group Atomic Kitten just one year earlier.
Play was one of many artists to record their version of the classic "Ain't No Mountain High Enough," which was originally performed in 1967 by Marvin Gaye and Tammi Terrell.

Other songs on the album were later covered by other artists:
Play was the first to record "What Is Love," but actress-singer Raven-Symoné covered this song for her 2004 album This Is My Time, it was also covered by British singer Peter Andre for his 2004 album The Long Road Back.
Tata Young covered Play's song "I Must Not Chase The Boys" in her 2006 album Temperature Rising
The German singer, Joana Zimmer, covered "Let's Get To The Love Part" for her second album, The Voice In Me.
"2 Blocks Down" was used to write a Korean group Girls' Generation's song in their debut single "Beginning".
"11 Out of 10" was later covered by the pop German group No Angels.
The Belgian singer, Natalia, covered "Unspeakable" in her 2004 album Back for More.

Charts

References

External links
[ Billboard information page on Replay]

2003 albums
Play (Swedish group) albums
Columbia Records albums
Contemporary R&B albums by Swedish artists
Pop rock albums by Swedish artists